Pavel Vladislavovich Sukhov (born 7 May 1988) is a Russian right-handed épée fencer.

Sukhov is a two-time team European champion and 2012 individual European champion. A three-time Olympian, Sukhov is a 2021 team Olympic silver medalist. Sukhov competed in the 2012 London Olympic Games, the 2016 Rio de Janeiro Olympic Games, and the 2020 Tokyo Olympic Games.

Career
Sukhov began fencing at the age of 9. He originally played tennis but switched to fencing when his coach moved abroad.  He made his international debut for Russia at the 2008 Doha World Cup, and is a Russian Armed Forces Athlete.

Medal record

Olympic Games

World Championship

European Championship

World Cup

References

External links 
 
 
 
 
 
 

1988 births
Living people
Russian male épée fencers
Olympic fencers of Russia
Fencers at the 2012 Summer Olympics
Fencers at the 2016 Summer Olympics
Sportspeople from Samara, Russia
World Fencing Championships medalists
Fencers at the 2020 Summer Olympics
Olympic silver medalists for the Russian Olympic Committee athletes
Olympic medalists in fencing
Medalists at the 2020 Summer Olympics